Jukka Vilho Tapani Tammi (born April 10, 1962 in Tampere, Finland), nicknamed "Taisto", is a retired Finnish ice hockey goaltender.

Tammi is one of the few Finnish ice hockey players to have three or more Olympic medals. He was the "Ironman" of the Finnish SM-liiga, awarded to the player who plays the most consecutive games, and has been inducted into the Finnish Hockey Hall of Fame.  Although Tammi was a top Finnish goaltender, he was never drafted by an NHL team.

Career

Finland
Tammi started his career in the 1980-1981 season when he played for the Tampereen Ilves A-Junior team. Tammi also dressed for three SM-Liiga games, but he did not play until the following year when he played in four games. In 1982-1983 he played 25 games during the regular season, winning the Rookie of the Year award. Tammi went on to play in Ilves for a total of 15 Seasons (1980–1995). After Ilves, Tammi played in TuTo during the 1995-1996 season.

Germany
In 1996 Tammi moved to Germany and played for the Frankfurt Lions, a Deutsche Eishockey Liga team. Tammi played three seasons for the Lions, retiring after the 1998-99 season.

International
In addition to his SM-Liiga career, Tammi also had an International career. Tammi was part of Team Finland in total of seven Ice Hockey World Championships, four Winter Olympics and two Canada Cups. Tammi played a total of 213 International games and had one assist.

Highlights of Jukka Tammi's International career are: 
1988 Winter Olympics: Tammi played in the decisive game against the Soviet Union. Finland won the game and gained its first Olympic Medal in Ice Hockey.
1994 World Championships: Tammi was part of the team who won silver, losing to Canada in the final after a shootout.

Career statistics
                                            --- Regular Season ---  ---- Playoffs ----
Season   Team                        Lge    GP    G    A  Pts  PIM  GP   G   A Pts PIM
----
1984-85  Ilves Tampere               FNL    36    0    1    1    4
1985-86  Ilves Tampere               FNL    36    0    0    0    2  --  --  --  --  --
1986-87  Ilves Tampere               FNL    44    0    3    3    8  --  --  --  --  --
1987-88  Ilves Tampere               FNL    44    0    3    3   14
1988-89  Ilves Tampere               FNL    44    0    0    0    6   5   0   0   0   0
1989-90  Ilves Tampere               FNL    44    0    2    2    8   9   0   2   2   4
1990-91  Ilves Tampere               FNL    44    0    1    1   20  --  --  --  --  --
1991-92  Ilves Tampere               FNL    44    0    2    2   10  --  --  --  --  --
1992-93  Ilves Tampere               FNL    40    0    0    0    0
1993-94  Ilves Tampere               FNL    27    0    1    1    4   4   0   0   0   0
1994-95  Ilves Tampere               FNL    50    0    4    4   35  --  --  --  --  --
1995-96  TuTo Turku                  FNL    50    0    3    3   20  --  --  --  --  --
1996-97  Frankfurt Lions             DEL    40    0    3    3    6
1997-98  Frankfurt Lions             DEL    42    0    3    3   35
1998-99  Frankfurt Lions             DEL    43    0    4    4    6
----

References

External links

1962 births
Living people
Finnish ice hockey goaltenders
Finnish ice hockey world championship gold medalists
Frankfurt Lions players
Ice hockey players at the 1988 Winter Olympics
Ice hockey players at the 1992 Winter Olympics
Ice hockey players at the 1994 Winter Olympics
Ice hockey players at the 1998 Winter Olympics
Ilves players
Medalists at the 1988 Winter Olympics
Medalists at the 1994 Winter Olympics
Medalists at the 1998 Winter Olympics
Olympic bronze medalists for Finland
Olympic ice hockey players of Finland
Olympic medalists in ice hockey
Olympic silver medalists for Finland
Ice hockey people from Tampere
TuTo players